Adam Hyler (1735–1782), born in Wurttemberg, Germany, was a privateer and whaleboat captain during the American War for Independence. He harassed the British fleet in the New York harbor area, destroying ships and capturing crews. Hyler lived in New Brunswick, New Jersey.

Adam Hyler made several major raids on Sandy Hook and New York Harbor. On the evening of Friday, October 5, 1781, he led 6 whaleboats with his Sloop "Revenge" and captured British Prisoners, provisions and burnt many ships

The Monmouth County chapter of Hudson River Sloop Clearwater operated a Tuckerton Bay Sailing Garvey that is named after Adam Hyler. Now a museum piece at the Tuckerton Seaport Museum. 

Sea Scout Ship 24, a unit of Sea Scouting (Boy Scouts of America), based in Staten Island, NY is named in honor of Adam Hyler. The New Jersey Friends of Clearwater Chapter of Hudson River Sloop Clearwater operated a Tuckerton Bay Sailing Garvey that is named after Adam Hyler.

References

External links

 Whaleboat wars
 Other Gods: Adam Hyler
 West Jersey History
 Petition of Hyler's Crew

1735 births
1782 deaths
American privateers
People from New Brunswick, New Jersey